Wuyang County is a county in the central part of Henan province, China. It is both the westernmost and southernmost county-level division of the prefecture-level city of Luohe.

Administrative divisions
As 2012, this county is divided to 7 towns and 7 townships.
Towns

Townships

Climate

References

County-level divisions of Henan
Luohe